"Whole Lotta Woman" is a song performed by American singer Kelly Clarkson from her eighth studio album Meaning of Life. It is co-written by Clarkson and its producers—Jussifer, NOVA Wav duo Denisia Andrews and Brittany Coney, Fade Majah, and Jesse Shatkin. A soul anthem about female empowerment, the singer declares herself as a "whole lotta woman" and challenges men to "accept it or walk away". Songwriters put a "fun twist" in the lyrics to allude to the size of Clarkson's waistline, her attitude, her self-worth, and her mouth. Members of the American soul band Earth, Wind & Fire, led by bass player Verdine White, are featured in the song.

On the week of the album's release, Clarkson premiered "Whole Lotta Woman" in a live performance on The Tonight Show Starring Jimmy Fallon. In celebration of the 2018 International Day of the Girl Child, Clarkson performed the song on The Today Show.

Critical reception of the song was mixed. It reached number 142 on Billboard's US Digital Songs chart.

Writing and composition 

"Whole Lotta Woman" was co-written by Clarkson and producers Jussifer (Jussi Karvinen), NOVA Wav (Denisia Andrews and Brittany Coney), Fade Majah (Evon Barnes Jr.), and Jesse Shatkin. In a feature on Rolling Stone, Clarkson commented that the song stemmed from a conversation she had with the NOVA Wav duo in a session in Los Angeles. She recalled, "It was really fun to talk to them about how it took me awhile to fall in love because I am a whole lot of woman – I have a big personality. I'm a grown-ass woman that can pay her bills, and I make a lot of money. That's intimidating." Clarkson, who grew up in Texas, remarked in a profile on The New York Times that the song's inspiration came from the challenges of being a financially secure woman looking for a man after internalizing the paradoxes of growing up in the South. Clarkson says that in the South women are told, "We want to educate you and we want you to be intelligent, but not too intelligent to where you're intimidating; we want you to be beautiful, but not too sexy to where you're a slut; we want you to be successful but not so successful that you make someone feel uncomfortable.” As a female pop singer, Clarkson has expressed frustration that for years her appearance, particularly her weight, has been a constant topic of discussion. This led her to write a song that said "Yeah, you're right, I am a whole lot of woman, and it's ok. I came with a brain, and I came with drive and passion and sensuality, and these things that are awesome. If you can't handle it, that's totally cool, but you're not tall enough to ride this ride, then move along. It's fine."
 

"Whole Lotta Woman" is an anthem that utilizes a bass-heavy groove. The lyrics allude to the size of Clarkson's waistline, her attitude, her self-worth, and her mouth using references to Southern cooking and singer Tina Turner. Maura Johnston of Rolling Stone says "the music recalls classic soul anthems like 'Respect' while also having the pop of Janet Jackson's Rhythm Nation-era output like 'Black Cat. Craig Kallman, CEO of Atlantic Records, executive produced the album with Clarkson, and commissioned the horn section of Earth, Wind & Fire, along with its bass player, Verdine White, to perform on the song.

Critical reception 
In a feature in The New York Times, Caryn Ganz described the song as a "feisty throwdown" and a centerpiece to Meaning of Life. Stacey Leasca of Glamour picked the track as the favorite from the album. Idolator's Mike Wass referred it as one of the album's highlights. Reviewing the album for The Atlantic, Spencer Kornhamer wrote that the song verges on "the edge of feeling like costume play—but Clarkson connects the revival-church sound to her biography, playing up her Texan bona fides" and praised its outro as "fascinating, mutating into a trap breakdown but with women singing that style's 'hey' rhythm like doo-wop." Glenn Gamboa of Newsday observed that Clarkson looks to innovate as "she takes a throwback soul arrangement to the song and adds intricate, current R&B phrasing and lyrics like 'I'm a strong, bad-ass chick with classic confidence' to create something new".

Los Angeles Times' Michael Wood noted that "she lays out the makings of a 'badass chick with classic confidence' in the song, but ends up with a 'pile of Southern clichés and added that it "plays like a female answer to 'Boys 'Round Here by Blake Shelton. Hannah Davies of The Guardian wrote that song feels like "a filler", and described its "body-positive pop" as sticking a "little too closely to the Meghan Trainor mould." Whereas Spin magazine's Katherine St. Asaph wrote that the song's lyrics felt "forced" and described it as "where soul becomes vaguely appropriative, sub-Austin Powers caricature."

Live performances 
To promote the album's release, Clarkson debuted "Whole Lotta Woman" in a performance on The Tonight Show Starring Jimmy Fallon on October 31, 2017. She also filmed a "Nashville Sessions" performance of the song at the War Memorial Auditorium in Nashville, Tennessee, which was released on November 2, 2017. Clarkson showcased the song on the Carpool Karaoke segment of The Late Late Show with James Corden, the 2017 Dick Clark's New Year's Rockin' Eve, and in live performances at the 2018 Billboard Music Awards and the iHeartRadio Music Festival. On October 11, 2018, in celebration of the 2018 International Day of the Girl Child, Clarkson performed the song in a special presentation on The Today Show to help the launch of the Global Girls Alliance educational campaign by former First Lady of the United States Michelle Obama.

Credits and personnel 
Credits from the album's liner notes.

 Lead vocals – Kelly Clarkson
 Background vocals – Nicole Hurst, Bridget Sarai
 Saxophone (baritone, tenor) – Leon Silva
 Bass – Jesse Shatkin, Verdine White
 Drum programming, additional programming, synthesizer – Jesse Shatkin
 Drums – Jesse Shatkin, John Paris
 Engineers – Jesse Shatkin, Michael Harris
 Additional engineer – Samuel Dent
 Assistant engineer – Chris Cerullo, Todd Tidwell
 Flugelhorn – Sean Erick
 Guitar – Morris O'Connor, Srdjan Dimitrijevic

 Horns – Earth, Wind & Fire Horns Section, The Regiment Horns
 Horn orchestrator, leader, music preparation – Raymond Lee Brown
 Mixer – Serban Ghenea
 Mastering – Chris Gehringer
 Producers – Fade Majah, Jussifer, Nova Wav, Jesse Shatkin
 Production coordinator – JoAnn Tominaga
 Tenor Saxophone – Gary Bias
 Trombone – Reggie Young, Kevin Williams Jr.
 Tuba – Kevin Williams Jr.
 Trumpet – Bobby Burns, Sean Erick, Chuck Findley

Charts

See also 
 Media and gender § Body image
 Women in music
 Women's empowerment

References 

2017 songs
Atlantic Records singles
Kelly Clarkson songs
Song recordings produced by Jesse Shatkin
Songs with feminist themes
Songs written by Jesse Shatkin
Songs written by Kelly Clarkson
Songs written by Jussifer